This list includes a number of television shows which have received negative reception from both critics and audiences alike, some of which are considered the worst of all time.

Criteria
Factors that can reflect poorly on a television series include inherently poor quality, the lack of a budget, rapid cancellation, very low viewership, offensive content, and negative impact on other series on the same channel. Multiple outlets have produced lists ranking the worst television series, including TV Guide, Entertainment Weekly and Mail Online. TV Guide published lists in 2002 and 2010, each of which had contemporary shows near the top of the list.

The following is a list of television series notable for negative reception—some of which are considered the worst of all time by critics, network executives, and viewers (with extremely low viewership despite high promotion). Situation comedy shows make up a large percentage, so they are listed in a separate page.

Animated shows

The Brothers Grunt Created by future Ed, Edd 'n' Eddy creator Danny Antonucci, The Brothers Grunt premiered on MTV in August 1994 in the network's attempt to capitalize on their earlier success of Mike Judge’s Beavis and Butt-Head, but the show was canceled after seven months and derided by critics and viewers for its gross-out content. Kenneth R. Clark of the Chicago Tribune wrote that MTV "created the most repulsive creatures ever to show up on a television screen". Charles Solomon of the Los Angeles Times deemed it a "sophomoric half-hour that leaves the viewer longing for the refined good taste of Alice Cooper." The Boston Globe called the show "moronic", while Steve Hall of The Indianapolis Star commented: "Compared to this ... Beavis and Butt-Head looks like a masterpiece of social satire." Jean Prescott of The Pantagraph, in 1999, cited The Brothers Grunt as an "animation disaster". In their 2002 book North of Everything: English-Canadian Cinema Since 1980, authors William Beard and Jerry White called the series a "failure". Writer David Hofstede included the show among his selection of "The 100 Dumbest Events In Television History" in 2004: "Given the ... grotesque appearance of the characters, it's not surprising that the series didn't last."

Bucky and Pepito  The 1959 syndicated series Bucky and Pepito has been criticized for its poor production quality and racial stereotyping. It was produced by Sam Singer, who is referred to as "the Ed Wood of animation" by Jerry Beck for his low-budget and generally ill-reviewed style. The show was described by Fast Company technology editor Harry McCracken as setting "a standard for awfulness that no contemporary TV cartoon has managed to surpass". In his 2011 book Television Westerns: Six Decades of Sagebrush Sheriffs, Scalawags, and Sidewinders, author Alvin H. Marill wrote that the show "managed to set TV animation back to the early crude days", and castigated Pepito—who was voiced by white actor Dallas McKennon — as "pure Mexican stereotype—from the huge sombrero that covered his eyes to [his] slow, lazy ways ... mentioned in the show's theme song." Writer David Perlmutter described Bucky and Pepito as being "racially troubling" and having "poor animation and cliché-ridden writing". Media historian Hal Erickson called Pepito "non-politically correct [and] stereotyped" and the show's animation "arguably the worst of any TV cartoon of the 1950s." One episode was featured on Beck's Cartoon Brew webseries Cartoon Dump in 2007.

Father of the Pride Father of the Pride was a 2004 primetime computer-animated series that centered around a family of white lions whose titular patriarch stars in a Siegfried & Roy show in Las Vegas, but pre-release publicity was affected by Roy Horn being attacked by a tiger during a 2003 performance while the show was in production. Despite studio DreamWorks Animation marketing the show to younger audiences, NBC was forced to return $50,000 in funding to the Family Friendly Programming Forum after airing a series of promos during the 2004 Summer Olympics that showed characters making sexual references, and the program itself was panned by critics for its crude adult-oriented humor. The Las Vegas Sun commented: "Father of the Pride isn't suitable for children. Unless, of course, you consider references to sex acts and bestiality OK for younger ears." The combination of pre-release issues, negative reviews and poor ratings led to the show's cancellation after only thirteen episodes. Newsday named Father of the Pride one of the "worst shows of the 21st century", and The Daily Beast rated it among NBC's "most embarrassing flops of the last decade". Chris Longridge of Digital Spy said in 2017, "[It] didn't help that Roy Horn was attacked by one of his own tigers before the show got to air. File under catastrophic misjudgment."

Ren & Stimpy "Adult Party Cartoon" The Ren & Stimpy Show creator John Kricfalusi rebooted his original 1991 series for the relaunch of The National Network as Spike TV, as part of its new adult animation block. Ren & Stimpy "Adult Party Cartoon" premiered in June 2003 and contained significantly more vulgar content than its predecessor, which resulted in only three of nine ordered episodes being aired by the network. Rob Owen of the Pittsburgh Post-Gazette described it as "just plain gross. ... They don't pay me enough to watch cartoon characters eating snot." Charles Solomon of the Los Angeles Times criticized the show as "'adult' only in the sense that you wouldn’t want kids watching them." Tucson Weekly and Exclaim! both labeled it "disastrous". DVD Talk praised the show's animation, "but the weak stories epitomize empty, heavy-handed shock value." Matt Schimkowitz of Splitsider opined that the show's intended audience was "the 16-year-olds who grew up on the [original] show and are ready to handle such hilarious topics as spousal abuse and eating boogers." Comic Book Resources, in 2018, called it "perhaps the most hated animated reboot ever." The negative reaction to the show tainted Kricfalusi's reputation and resulted in a 2016 pitch for a Ren & Stimpy feature film being rejected by Paramount Pictures. Billy West, who voiced Stimpy in the original series, had turned down Kricfalusi's offer to reprise the part in Adult Party Cartoon: "It would have damaged my career. It was one of the worst things I ever saw."

Velma Created by Charlie Grandy, this 2023 HBO Max series based on the popular Scooby-Doo franchise was pitched as a "love quadrangle" between the Mystery Inc. group, but primarily focuses on Velma Dinkley, voiced by Mindy Kaling, trying to solve a mystery regarding the disappearance of her mother, as well as the numerous murders of local teenage girls. The show was criticized by Liz Shannon Miller of Consequence for the show's unbalanced tone, lack of focus, absence of Scooby-Doo, overstuffed narrative and feeling "a bit PG in comparison to other adult animation currently in the works." In a review for IGN, Brittany Vincent criticized the series' portrayal of Velma, comparing the title character to "a biting, hateful version of Daria without the character growth", stating that this aspect of the show held it back from being what it strives to be. In Variety, Joshua Alston wrote that the show was "irreverent to a fault", extolling most of the humor but stating that it could have belong to any other comedy series. He also criticized the portrayal of the Mystery Inc. gang, being described as "just really unpleasant to spend time with."

Live-action children's shows

Minipops This 1983 Channel 4 show featured children between the ages of eight and twelve singing contemporary pop songs, often dressed and made up to resemble the original artists. The programme made many adult viewers uncomfortable when some of the juvenile singers imitated the provocative styles of adult performers. One performance by eight-year-old Joanna Fisher sparked outrage when, while performing the Sheena Easton song "9 to 5", she sang the lyrics "Night time is the right time/We make love". Despite the show's popularity, the resulting controversy caused Minipops to be cancelled after only six episodes. John Naughton of The Radio Times named Minipops the second-worst UK television show in history in 2006. The Daily Telegraph, in 2019, called Minipops an "all-round televisual travesty".

Barney & Friends
 Ranking 50th on the TV Guide 2002 list of worst television shows in American history (the only public television series, PBS or otherwise, to make the list), Barney & Friends has been subject to a barrage of vicious and often dark anti-Barney humor and vitriol since its debut in the late 1980s (as the direct-to-video Barney and the Backyard Gang). Barney, and the intense backlash it drew, were the subject of the 2022 documentary miniseries I Love You, You Hate Me, a name partially taken from a schoolyard mockery of Barney's signature song. Quoth W. J. T. Mitchell, a media theorist, in his book The Last Dinosaur Book: "Barney is on the receiving end of more hostility than just about any other popular cultural icon I can think of."

Dramas and soap operas
The Colbys Although much hyped in 1985, garnering high ratings for its premiere episode, and also the winner of a 1986 People's Choice Award for New Dramatic TV Program, The Colbys was ultimately a ratings disappointment. The first season finished in 35th place, in part due to competition with NBC's Cheers and Night Court on Thursday nights (by comparison, Dynasty finished in 7th place the same season). The series was renewed for a second season, but fared much worse. Now, not only being scheduled opposite NBC's multi-camera sitcoms, Cheers and Night Court, but also rival soap Knots Landing on CBS, and later in the season, having to compete with another multi-camera sitcom, The Cosby Show, The Colbys finished a dismal 76th for the year prompting the network to cancel the show. The series did not fare well among critics either, with one of its main criticisms being that it was simply a copy of Dynasty. The Los Angeles Times stated "It's not a spinoff, it's a clone—as close a replica as ABC and the Dynasty producers could concoct, right down to the credits." The Pittsburgh Press compared the scripts to Dick and Jane books for children. In their Directory To Primetime TV Shows, television historians Tim Brooks and Earle Marsh stated that the series likely failed because it was "too close a copy" of Dynasty. Even some cast members were vocal about their dissatisfaction with the series. In 1986, Barbara Stanwyck opted to end her contract and leave the series after its first season, reportedly calling it "a turkey" and telling co-creator Esther Shapiro "This is the biggest pile of garbage I ever did" and that "It's one thing to know you're making a lot of money off vulgarity, but when you don't know it's vulgar – it's plain stupid." On the contrary, Charlton Heston always had supported the show and stated its cancellation "was premature" as "we were coming closer to being a creative production team that could make the kind of show we'd planned on from the beginning."
Cop Rock This musical police procedural, which aired on ABC in 1990, has been cited as one of the worst television series ever as it ranked No. 8 on TV Guides 50 Worst TV Shows of All Time list in 2002. The show was a critical and commercial failure from the beginning and was canceled by the network after 11 episodes. Owing to the combination of its bizarre nature and its high-powered production talent (including an Emmy win for composer Randy Newman), it became infamous as one of the biggest television failures of the 1990s.

Eldorado This BBC soap opera from 1992 was, despite heavy advertising, a notorious flop. Many of the cast were inexperienced actors whose limitations were clearly exposed on such a new and ambitious project; the acting was derided as amateurish, while the attempt to appear more 'European' by having people speaking other languages without subtitles or bizarre/unconvincing accents was met by viewers with incomprehension and ridicule. Eldorado is remembered as an embarrassing failure for the BBC, and is sometimes used as a byword for any unsuccessful, poorly received or overhyped television programme.

Ironside (2013) NBC's remake of Raymond Burr's 1967 crime drama was canceled after only four episodes due to poor ratings, and drew protest beforehand from disabled actors for casting Blair Underwood as the wheelchair-using title character. NBC responded that an able-bodied actor was needed to perform flashback scenes, but actor Kurt Yaeger likened it to "having a white guy do blackface". Neil Genzlinger of The New York Times wrote that the show's "plodding writing" and Underwood's performance "makes the title character an unpleasant combination of macho and brusque," and Slant noted Underwood's "oppressive, angry" portrayal as "a protagonist who believes his impairment gives him the authority to act like a total ass". The show was described by Complex as "an eye-rolling, monotonous, procedural mess", and by the St. Louis Post-Dispatch as an "unnecessary remake" that was "too grim and unengaging". Tim Goodman of The Hollywood Reporter commented, "It's just another detective show. And it's not even a very good one." The A.V. Club, Rolling Stone, New York Post, and USA Today named Ironside among their worst shows of 2013.

Skins (U.S. remake) MTV's 2011 remake of the 2007 British series generated controversy over its sexual content and raised accusations of child pornography, since many of the actors were under the age of 18. Outcry from the Parents Television Council, along with numerous companies pulling their advertising from the program, led to the series being canceled after one season of ten episodes.

The Spike Irish drama series on RTÉ, set at a secondary school. Episode five featured "the briefest glimpse of naked flesh". The episode sparked debate in Dáil Éireann and was condemned by the Taoiseach Jack Lynch, despite him having never seen the programme. On the day that the sixth episode was due to air it was axed. The remaining episodes remain locked away and have neither been broadcast on RTÉ nor viewed by members of the general public. The Spike was later featured on RTÉ's scandal series, Scannal, with the Irish Independent naming it as one of their "Top 10 Worst Irish TV Programmes".

Supertrain Supertrain was the most expensive series ever aired in the United States at the time. The production was beset by problems including a model train that crashed. While the series was heavily advertised during the 1978–79 season, it suffered from poor reviews and low ratings. Despite attempts to salvage the show by reworking the cast, it never took off and left the air after only three months. NBC, which had produced the show itself, with help from Dark Shadows producer Dan Curtis, was unable to recoup its losses. Combined with the U.S. boycott of the 1980 Summer Olympics the following season, which cost NBC millions in ad revenue, the series nearly bankrupted the network. For these reasons, Supertrain has been called one of the greatest television flops. The A.V. Club noted that Supertrain has a reputation as "one of the worst television series ever made...it was hugely expensive, little watched, and critically derided".

Triangle A soap opera about a British ferry that starred Kate O'Mara, Triangle is remembered as "some of the most mockable British television ever produced". The series is even humorously mentioned in passing in the BBC comedy series The Young Ones - "Even Triangle has better furniture than this!" 

Viva Laughlin CBS's 2007 American adaptation of the British series Blackpool lasted only two episodes, one in Australia. Like the aforementioned Cop Rock, the series was an attempt to create a musical TV drama; in this case, the series had a fatal flaw in that the lead actors sang over hit records with the original vocal tracks intact. The opening line of The New York Times review said, "Viva Laughlin on CBS may well be the worst new show of the season, but is it the worst show in the history of television?" Newsdays review started with, "The stud is a dud. And that's only the first of a dozen problems with CBS' admirably ambitious but jaw-droppingly wrongheaded new musical/murder mystery/family drama Viva Laughlin. Let us count the ways it bombs..."

Fantasy and science fiction shows
Galactica 1980 The 1979 cancellation of Battlestar Galactica prompted a letter-writing campaign by fans that convinced ABC to revive the show as Galactica 1980, but with a significantly reduced budget that resulted in the setting being changed to Earth three decades after the events of the original program, while the cast was overhauled save for Lorne Greene and Herbert Jefferson Jr. Galactica 1980 was negatively received as a result and canceled after ten episodes. GamesRadar+ named the show among its "Top 25 Worst Sci-Fi and Fantasy TV Shows Ever" in 2012, lambasting its "cardboard cut-out heroes" and having "more loathsome kids than any other SF show ever." Gordon Jackson of io9 criticized it as "ill-advised" and "lack[ing] any of the zest of the original series." Carol Pinchefsky of Syfy wrote in 2017, "[P]lease, oh please, let’s not think about Galactica 1980", and The Guardian called the show "woeful". Luke Y. Thompson of Nerdist deemed it "extremely difficult to defend," and considered the absence of original series star Richard Hatch a factor in its demise. Hatch had rejected reprising his role as Captain Apollo, as he felt the changes "ruined the story. I just wasn’t interested." In 2020, 40 years after the show's broadcast, Medium described Galactica 1980 as "having earned its dubious place in the history of televised science fiction".

Inhumans The 2017 eight-episode miniseries—based on the Marvel Comics race of the same name—was canceled by ABC after one season due to low ratings, and is regarded by critics as one of the worst works by Marvel. The IMAX premiere of the first two episodes was poorly received and grossed only $2.6 million in its opening weekend, with Comic Book Resources commenting that "Inhumans is already a disaster" that "sounded a sour note with fans". The Hollywood Reporter criticized the "poorly developed characters [and] confusing superpowers", and Entertainment Weekly noted the "terrible acting". The series was described as "look[ing] like the worst Marvel show out there" by The New York Times, "a disappointment on every level" by IGN, "a messy, miserable show" by io9, and by Vox as "jaw-droppingly awful television. Even worse, it’s boring." Uproxx opined that Inhumans "has no reason to exist except that Marvel wanted it to, by any means necessary.” IndieWire declared that the series was "the worst thing Marvel has done in decades".

Manimal Manimal was scheduled by NBC opposite CBS's Dallas, and was canceled after eight episodes due to low ratings. It was a part of NBC's 1983 fall line-up, which featured eight other series that were canceled before their first seasons ended (including Jennifer Slept Here and Bay City Blues). John Javna's book The Best of Science Fiction TV rated Manimal among its "Worst Science Fiction Shows of All Time". TV Guide ranked Manimal number 15 on their list of the 50 Worst TV Shows of All Time in 2002. In 2004, readers of the British trade magazine Broadcast voted Manimal as one of the worst television shows ever exported by the US to the UK.

Game shows
Don't Scare the Hare The premiere of the 2011 British game show hosted by Jason Bradbury drew 1.93 million viewers for a 15% audience share, but was canceled after only three of nine planned episodes due to poor ratings. Jim Shelley of the Daily Mirror  wrote: "The idiots playing might have enjoyed themselves but even toddlers would have found the games dull and Jason creepy." The Stage observed: "The actual games are pretty feeble and uninspired, leaving the poor hare and his robotic novelty value to carry the show." John Anson of the Lancashire Evening Post opined: "If you're going to have a gimmick in your game show at least make it entertaining. ... Make the questions simple, involve bunches of kids and hey, presto it works... But primetime Saturday night viewing it ain't." Alex May of Now Then magazine called the show "without question, the worst game show in the world, ever." Complex said in 2011, "Don't Scare The Hare was cancelled after only three episodes aired for a reason—the show was absolutely terrible". Caroline Westbrook of Metro listed the "frankly bizarre" show among her 2013 selection of "so bad they're brilliant" game shows. Digital Spy rated Don't Scare the Hare sixth among the "10 of the worst TV shows of all time" in 2016, and Scott Harris-King of Grunge included it in his 2017 list of "dumb game shows someone should've been fired for".

The Million Second Quiz Marred by a confusing and boring format that jeopardized the health of its contestants, excessive and unwarranted hype, banal questions, and a random decision to inflate the grand prize after it was won solely to set the record for most money won on a single game show, The Million Second Quiz was lambasted by critics and suffered from collapsing ratings throughout its short run in 2013. A review for The A.V. Club was indicative of the reception: "so deeply flawed and so universally unpopular that it is not going to remain in anyone's memory for long."

Naked Jungle A UK game show on Channel 5 that revolved around naturists performing an assault course. Naked Jungle was savaged by critics, denounced by nudists for being exploitative and even condemned in the House of Commons of the United Kingdom. A group of TV historians later voted it the worst British TV show ever. Host Keith Chegwin later called presenting the show "the worst career move I made in my entire life".

Shafted A UK game show aired on ITV presented by Robert Kilroy Silk. It is most notorious for Kilroy-Silk's laughable actions on the show, which have since been frequently mocked on popular satirical show Have I Got News for You since late 2004. Particularly notable is his delivery of the show's tagline, "Their fate will be in each other's hands as they decide whether to share or to shaft", and the associated hand actions. The show was dropped just four episodes after it started in 2001, and was listed as the worst British television show of the 2000s in the Penguin TV Companion (2006). A 2012 postmortem of the show read: "Nothing seemed to work for Shafted from the start. It looked derivative, it sounded derivative, the format was pretty unfair, the host was bad, and it just wasn't that interesting. So basically nothing worked out." In an article on ITV programmes, Stuart Heritage described Shafted as "Hamfisted" and stated it was "deservedly remembered as one of the worst television programmes ever made".

Three's a Crowd A game show created and produced by Chuck Barris, and hosted by Jim Peck, which aired in syndication from 1979 to 1980. In it, a male contestant was asked pointed personal questions, which were then asked of both his wife and secretary, to find out which of the two knew him better. David Hofstede, author of What Were They Thinking?: The 100 Dumbest Events in Television History wrote that it "offered the chance to watch a marriage dissolve on camera years before Jerry Springer", and noted that it received backlash from the United Auto Workers and the National Organization for Women. By the time the controversy settled in 1980, Three's a Crowd and all three of Barris's other shows (The Dating Game, The Newlywed Game and The Gong Show) had been canceled. His next two projects, revivals of Treasure Hunt and Camouflage, neither of which lasted beyond one season, were also failures; Barris, whose reputation was effectively ruined by both this and some not-safe-for-TV incidents Barris allowed and encouraged on The Gong Show, would never again create a new game show and would stick to revivals of his previously existing shows for the rest of his career.

Who's Whose The 1951 panel game show was described at the time as "one of the most poorly produced TV shows yet to hit our living room screen," and "a miserable flop." while columnist Rex Lardner wrote that the show was "the worst ever to hit television." Who's Whose, rushed into production to fill a hole caused when The Goldbergs refused to comply with the Hollywood blacklist, was the first television series to be canceled after one episode, and its host, radio personality Phil Baker, had his contract bought out; it would be Baker's only television hosting role.

You're in the Picture The premiere of this 1961 CBS game show hosted by Jackie Gleason received extremely hostile reviews that the following Friday, Gleason appeared in the same time slot inside a stripped-down studio to give what Time magazine called an "inspiring post-mortem", asking rhetorically "how it was possible for a group of trained people to put on so big a flop." Time later cited You're in the Picture as one piece of evidence that the 1960–61 TV season was the "worst in the [then] 13-year history of U.S. network television."

News
The Morning Program On January 12, 1987, The Morning Program made its debut on CBS hosted by actress Mariette Hartley and Rolland Smith, former longtime anchor at WCBS-TV in New York City. Radio personality Mark McEwen handled the weather, while Bob Saget did comedy bits. Produced by the network's entertainment division, the show ran for 90 minutes (7:30–9am local time) behind a briefly expanded 90-minute CBS Early Morning News (6–7:30am local; although most larger affiliates pre-empted all or part of the 6–7am hour to produce a local morning newscast), which had dropped "Early" from its title. However, The Morning Program, with its awkward mix of news, entertainment, and comedy, became the joke of the industry, receiving scathing reviews. At one point, it generated the lowest ratings CBS had seen in the morning slot in five years. The format was aborted and the time slot returned to the news division after a ten-and-a-half-month run. Hartley and Smith were dumped, while Saget left to star on the ABC sitcom Full House, which premiered later that same year. A longtime producer summed up this version of the program upon its demise by saying, "...everyone thought we had the lowest ratings you could have in the morning. The Morning Program proved us wrong."

Reality television series

The Briefcase An American reality TV series created by Dave Broome that premiered on CBS on 27 May 2015. In each episode, two American families undergoing financial hardship are each given a briefcase containing $101,000, and must decide whether to keep all the money for themselves or give some or all of it to the other family. Over the course of 72 hours, each family learns about the other and makes a decision without knowing that the other family has also been given a briefcase with the same instructions. The Briefcase was met with largely negative reception from critics. Ken Tucker, critic-at-large of Yahoo! TV, described it as "cynical and repulsive" for "passing off its exploitation...as uplifting, inspirational TV." Jason Miller of Time.com called it "the worst reality TV show ever". Others compared the show to fictional films and television that pitted the needy against each other, such as the Twilight Zone episode "Button, Button", or The Hunger Games. A petition was made on Change.org to end the show with more than 60,000 supporters.

Here Comes Honey Boo Boo An American reality television series on TLC, featuring the family of child beauty pageant contestant Alana "Honey Boo Boo" Thompson. The show premiered on August 8, 2012. Thompson and her family originally rose to fame on TLC's reality series Toddlers & Tiaras. The show mainly revolves around Alana "Honey Boo Boo" Thompson and "Mama" June Shannon and their family's adventures in the southern town of McIntyre, Georgia. Critical reaction to the series was largely negative, with some characterizing the show as "offensive," "outrageous," and "exploitative," while others called it "must-see TV." The A.V. Club called the first episode a "horror story posing as a reality television program," with others worrying about potential child exploitation.

Jersey Shore A string of controversies over the U.S. MTV series documenting members of the Guido subculture made this series one of the most controversial in television history.

The One: Making a Music Star At the time of its premiere, according to overnight ratings from Nielsen Media Research, the first episode of The One was the lowest-rated series premiere in ABC history, and the second-worst such episode in the history of American broadcast television, scoring only 3.2 million total viewers (1.1 rating in the 18–49 demographic), and fifth place in its timeslot. In Canada, the premiere of The One on CBC had 236,000 viewers, which trailed far behind Canadian Idol on CTV and Rock Star: Supernova on Global, each scoring around one million viewers. The next night's results episode fared even worse in the United States ratings, sinking to a 1.0 rating in the 18–49 demographic. The re-run of night 1's episode (which preceded the results show) plunged to an embarrassingly low 0.6 average in the vital demo ratings. The poor performance of the show helped ABC measure its lowest-rated night in the network's history (among 18–49s), finishing tied for sixth place. The series was ultimately cancelled after a second week of poor results. According to CBC executive Kirstine Layfield, in terms of resources and money, The One "had the most backing from ABC than any summer show has ever had (sic)." The One was touted as a show that would dethrone American Idol, then the most-watched show in the United States; such high expectations for the series made the resounding public rejection of it all the more spectacular. Canadian ratings have dipped as low as 150,000  – not necessarily out of step with the CBC's usual summer ratings, although much lower than the broadcaster's stated expectations for primetime audiences, in the one-million range. The CBC initially insisted that despite the cancellation, a planned Canadian version may still go ahead, citing the success of the format in Quebec (Star Académie) and Britain (the BBC's Fame Academy). The network confirmed that the show will not air in fall 2006 – in fact, the show had never been given a fall timeslot – but the show was "still under development." Critical response was limited but generally negative. A 2018 article on TV By the Numbers identified the show as “the nadir of ABC’s forays into music competitions,” among a list of seven major flops in the format ABC had attempted in the 21st century (the article noted in its headline “ABC is terrible at music shows”).John de Mol Jr. (the creator of The One) would later find much greater success with his next music-based reality contest, The Voice.

The Swan The 2004 plastic surgery reality series has been panned by multiple critics. Robert Bianco of USA Today called The Swan "hurtful and repellent even by reality's constantly plummeting standards". Journalist Jennifer Pozner, in her book Reality Bites Back, calls The Swan "the most sadistic reality series of the decade". Journalist Chris Hedges also criticized the show in his 2009 book Empire of Illusion, writing "The Swan'''s transparent message is that once these women have been surgically 'corrected' to resemble mainstream celebrity beauty as closely as possible, their problems will be solved". Feminist scholar Susan J. Douglas criticized the show in her book The Rise of Enlightened Sexism for its continuation of a negative female body image, claiming that "it made all too explicit the narrow physical standards to which women are expected to conform, the sad degree to which women internalize these standards, the lengths needed to get there, and the impossibility for most of us to meet the bar without, well, taking a box cutter to our faces and bodies". Author Alice Marwick believes that this program is an example of "body culture media", which she describes as "a genre of popular culture which positions work on the body as a morally correct solution to personal problems". Marwick also suggests that cosmetic reality television encourages viewers to frame their family, financial, or social problems in bodily terms, and portrays surgical procedures as an everyday and normal solution. The Swan attracted further criticism internationally as British comedian and writer Charlie Brooker launched attacks on it during his Channel 4 show You Have Been Watching, where guest Josie Long suggested the show be renamed "The bullies were right". In 2013, second-season contestant Lorrie Arias spoke publicly about problems she attributed to her participation in The Swan, including unresolved surgery complications and mental health problems she says were exacerbated by her appearance on the program. The show was ranked at No. 1 in Entertainment Weeklys 10 Worst Reality-TV Shows Ever.

Sitcoms

Specials and television filmsThe Decision: On July 8, 2010, LeBron James announced on a live ESPN special that he would be playing for the Miami Heat for the 2010–11 season. In exchange for the rights to air the special, ESPN agreed to hand over its advertising and airtime to James. James arranged for the special to include an interview conducted by Jim Gray, who was paid by James's marketing company and had no affiliation with the network. The show drew criticism for making viewers wait 28 minutes before James revealed his decision, and the spectacle involved. James's phrase "taking my talents to South Beach", which he spoke in revealing his choice, became a punchline for critics. Though the special drew 13 million viewers, ESPN's reporting leading up to the program, its decision to air it and the network's relinquishing of editorial independence in the process were cited as gross violations of journalistic ethics. Forbes, in 2012, listed James as one of the world's most disliked athletes on the basis of his move to Miami.Eaten Alive: A 2014 television special on Discovery Channel that purported to have host Paul Rosolie swallowed whole by an eighteen-foot anaconda, it drew criticism before its airing from those who felt Discovery was aiming for sensationalism and shock value. Rosolie was never actually consumed by the creature before the stunt was prematurely called off due to safety concerns, which resulted in heavy viewer complaints. PETA criticized the special as an example of "entertainment features ... that show humans interfering with and handling wild animals [that] are detrimental to species conservation." In January 2015, Discovery president Rich Ross admitted the special's promotion was "misleading."Elvis in Concert:This TV special was a recorded Elvis Presley concert held on June 19, 1977; it was one of the last concerts of his career. Presley's deteriorating health was evident in his weight gain and his inability to remember lyrics of several songs. It has been described as "terrible and embarrassing" and a "travesty." Had Presley not died on August 16 of the same year, CBS would have likely never aired the concert, and only did so in October, after his death, and again in May 1978; the network had plans to record another concert to get better footage, but this was rendered impossible after Presley's death. The Presley estate refuses to release the special on VHS or DVD to this day.Exposed! Pro Wrestling's Greatest Secrets: The documentary was criticized for being sensationalist, misleading, and outdated in the presentation of the "secret tricks." Critics in and out of the wrestling business contend that many of the "secrets" exposed were already widely known by fans to begin with, and others were so obscure as to be non-notable. While most of the professional wrestling world refrained from acknowledging the program, the night following its airing, Ernest "The Cat" Miller entered the ring during WCW Monday Nitro and sarcastically shouted in a melodramatic tone to the audience, "Now you know all our secrets!" Mick Foley on WWF Monday Night RAW announced to tag partner Al Snow, "We didn't do so well last week, but last night, the secrets of professional wrestling were revealed to me!" Foley also poked fun at the program several times in his autobiography, Have a Nice Day!First Night 2013 with Jamie Kennedy: On December 31, 2012, KDOC-TV aired a live New Year's Eve special hosted by comedian and actor Jamie Kennedy. It was riddled with mishaps and technical issues, including periods of dead air, unedited explicit language, and Kennedy randomly speaking into his microphone, unaware he was live. A fistfight erupted onstage during the end credits. The special received a scathing critical reception, deemed "the world's worst New Year's broadcast" by The A.V. Club, "the worst New Year's Eve show of all time" by Uproxx, and "the worst in television history" by Gawker. Kotaku called it a "class-five flaming disaster", and Huffington Post noted the special's "astounding level of technical incompetence". In 2018, Good Housekeeping included the show among its selection of the "most dramatic TV catastrophes ever". Comedian Jensen Karp described Brett Kavanaugh's Supreme Court confirmation hearing that year as "running as smooth as a Jamie Kennedy New Years Eve special". Kennedy claimed the show's miscues were intentional, and defended his work in an interview with The New York Times: "I didn’t stab nobody, I didn’t shoot nobody. I just made a New Year’s Eve special. Is that so bad?"If I Did It: In November 2006, O. J. Simpson, who had been acquitted of the murder of his ex-wife Nicole Brown Simpson and her friend Ronald Goldman in a trial in 1995, wrote a book describing how, if he were to have actually committed the murder, how he would have done it. He arranged for a television special in which he would be interviewed by publisher Judith Regan to promote the book. NBC refused to air it, while Fox almost did before backing out at the insistence of its affiliates. The Goldman family, who won a $33,500,000 wrongful death settlement in 1997 against Simpson and insist he is guilty of the murders despite his acquittal, declared the special "an all-time low for television", and arranged for Regan's firing from HarperCollins for alleged "anti-Semitic remarks". Regan sued HarperCollins for wrongful termination and won, but Fox CEO Rupert Murdoch admitted the special was an "ill-considered project." The special never aired in its original form and the book's rights were turned over to the Goldmans, who retitled the book If I Did It: Confessions of the Killer, with the If in much smaller type. In 2018, the still-unaired special was reedited, with new bridging segments hosted by Soledad O'Brien, and given the name O.J. Simpson: The Lost Confession. The Goldman family approved of the reedited special, which aired in March 2018.Liz & Dick: This 2012 Lifetime original movie starred Lindsay Lohan in the title role of Elizabeth Taylor, a casting move that earned wide derision. Matt Roush of TV Guide panned the film, calling it an "epic of pathetic miscasting" and "laughably inept". According to David Wiegand of the San Francisco Chronicle, the film is "so terrible, you'll need to ice your face when it's over to ease the pain of wincing for two hours" and "the performances range from barely adequate to terrible. That would be [Grant] Bowler [as Richard Burton] in the "barely adequate" slot and Lohan, well, in the other one." Jeff Simon of The Buffalo News noted, based on a consensus of other reviews, that "it's the howler everyone expected" and openly mused that the film could end Lohan's acting career. At Metacritic, which assigns a normalized rating out of 100 to reviews from mainstream critics, the film received an average score of 26, which indicates "generally unfavorable reviews", based on 27 reviews.Megalodon: The Monster Shark Lives: As part of their annual Shark Week programming, Discovery Channel aired a special on August 4, 2013 that alleged the continued existence of the megalodon, a long-extinct giant shark species. While the show attracted a record 4.8 million viewers, it was later criticized for fabricating events that were passed off therein as fact. Huffington Post called Shark Week "a disgrace" in response to the special. The Atlantic wrote, "[T]he last bastion of science-related television was Discovery Channel. But no more." Christie Wilcox of Discover accused the network of "peddling lies and faking stories for ratings." Wired deemed the show "the absolute worst of Shark Week" in that it "mockumentary-ized [reality] using fake experts and videos". John Oliver of The Daily Show called it "a faked two hour shark-gasm", and actor Wil Wheaton wrote that Discovery owed its viewers an apology for airing "a cynical ploy for ratings [that] deliberately lied to its audience and presented fiction as fact." The special was highlighted in a 2014 article by The Verge titled "How Shark Week Screws Scientists". Discovery responded that Megalodon had contained multiple disclaimers that some events were dramatized and that the "institutions or agencies" who appeared therein had no affiliation with the special, nor approved its contents.The Mystery of Al Capone's Vaults: Recently fired from his job as a reporter for ABC, Geraldo Rivera hosted this live syndicated television special in 1986, which involved opening a recently discovered vault previously owned by mafia boss Al Capone. Although the promotions for the special heavily implied that the vault was likely to contain valuable artifacts from Capone's life or possibly even dead bodies, when the vault was opened it was revealed to contain a handful of empty moonshine bottles and nothing else. The phrase "Al Capone's vault" soon entered the vernacular to refer to any event that is heavily hyped and promoted but spectacularly fails to live up to expectations. Several sitcoms made joking references to the disappointment. The special marked a turning point in Rivera's career, shifting from his previous career in journalism to a career in tabloid entertainment, including his eponymous talk show.Poochinski: This unsold pilot aired as a one-off special on NBC in 1990. The show, which featured Peter Boyle as the voice of a detective who is killed and reincarnated as a bulldog, has been retrospectively mocked for its bizarre premise and copious amounts of toilet humor.Warder, Robin (6 October 2012). 6 TV Shows You Won't Believe Were Actually Made, CrackedLyons, Margaret (6 January 2010). Clip du jour: 'Poochinski' is the best/worst show that never was, Entertainment WeeklyRapsittie Street Kids: Believe in Santa: This special has become infamous among fans of bad films. Ever since it aired on television, it received extremely negative reviews from critics and audiences, and has been repeatedly noted for its "hideous" and ugly computer animation and bizarre production history, though the ensemble voice cast received some praise.Star Wars Holiday Special: Generally, Star Wars Holiday Special has received a large amount of criticism, both from Star Wars fans and the general public. David Hofstede, author of What Were They Thinking?: The 100 Dumbest Events in Television History, ranked the holiday special at number one, calling it "the worst two hours of television ever." Shepard Smith, a former news anchor for the Fox News Channel, referred to it as a "'70s train wreck, combining the worst of Star Wars with the utter worst of variety television." Actor Phillip Bloch explained on a TV Land special entitled The 100 Most Unexpected TV Moments, that the special, "...just wasn't working. It was just so surreal." On the same program, Ralph Garman, a voice actor for the show Family Guy, explained that "Star Wars Holiday Special is one of the most infamous television programs in history. And it's so bad that it actually comes around to good again, but passes it right up." George Lucas himself is quoted as saying, “If I had the time and a sledgehammer, I would track down every copy of that program and smash it.” The only aspect of the special that has been generally well-received is the animated segment done by Canadian animation studio Nelvana, which introduces Boba Fett, who would later become a popular character when he appeared in the Star Wars theatrical films.The Star Wars Holiday Special (1978) Animated Cartoon Special - BCDBWho Wants to Marry a Multi-Millionaire?: This one-time special had fifty female contestants vying to immediately marry an unseen multimillionaire who, unknown to the contestants or viewers, only barely qualified for the title (owning only $2,000,000 in assets, including non-liquid ones) and who had a record of domestic violence. The winner, Darva Conger, never consummated her relationship with Rick Rockwell and the marriage was annulled. In a 2010 issue of TV Guide, the show was ranked No. 9 on a list of TV's ten biggest "blunders".

Sports
The Baseball Network (Baseball Night in America): The Baseball Network came immediately after CBS's four-year run as MLB's over-the-air broadcaster, which was itself a disaster, being compared at least once to the Exxon Valdez oil spill. This short-lived joint venture between ABC, NBC, and Major League Baseball was a pioneer in that the league produced and owned the rights to the telecasts (including half of the regular season and the postseason), but it was mostly a flop. The arrangement did not last long.  Due to the effects of a players' strike on the remainder of the 1994 season, as well as poor reception from fans and critics over how the coverage was implemented, The Baseball Network would be disbanded after the 1995 season. Criticism centered on several factors: that The Baseball Network held exclusivity over every market, which meant that in markets with two teams, a Baseball Network game featuring one team prevented all viewers in the market from seeing the other team's game that night; the fact that East Coast teams playing on the West Coast (or vice versa) could not be seen in the market as the start time would either be too late or early for the home market; and regionalized coverage well into the postseason, which led Sports Illustrateds Tom Verducci to dub The Baseball Network both "America's regional pastime" and an "abomination" and Bob Costas to write that it was an unprecedented surrender of prestige and a slap to all serious fans. Frustration was also shared by fans; the mere mention of The Baseball Network during the Mariners-Yankees ALDS from public address announcer Tom Hutyler at Seattle's Kingdome elicited boos from most of the crowd. ABC Sports president Dennis Swanson, in announcing the dissolution of The Baseball Network, said "The fact of the matter is, Major League Baseball seems incapable at this point in time, of living with any long term relationships, whether it's with fans, with players, with the political community in Washington, with the advertising community here in Manhattan, or with its TV partners."Celebrity Boxing: This self-explanatory series, an icon of Fox's "lowbrow" era of the late 1990s and early 2000s, ranked number 6 on TV Guides 50 Worst TV Shows of All Time list. Celebrities who participated in the two-episode contest were mostly D-list names and those involved in criminal cases (Joey Buttafuoco, Tonya Harding, and Paula Jones, while Buttafuoco's former lover Amy Fisher backed out of the contest); one match even featured a man (Buttafuoco) facing off against a woman (pro wrestler Chyna), with Buttafuoco (who had taken the place of "Weird Al" Yankovic, who refused to fight a woman) winning in a decision.NBA on ABC (2002–present): Some viewers have been critical of ABC's telecasts of the NBA since the 2002 season as one common complaint is of strange camera angles, including the Floorcam and Skycam angles used by ABC throughout its coverage. Other complaints are of camera angles that appear too far away, colors that seem faded and dull, and the quieting of crowd noise so that announcers can be heard clearly (by contrast to NBC, which allowed crowd noise to sometimes drown out their announcers). Some complaints have concerned the promotion, or perceived lack thereof, of NBA telecasts. The 2003 NBA Finals received very little fanfare on ABC or corporate partner ESPN; while subsequent Finals were promoted more on both networks, NBA related advertisements on ABC were still down significantly from promotions on NBC. NBA promos took up 3 minutes and 55 seconds of airtime on ABC during the week of May 23, 2004 according to the Sports Business Daily, comparable to 2 minutes and 45 seconds for the Indy 500. Promotions for the Indianapolis 500 outnumbered promotions for the NBA Finals fourteen-to-nine from the hours of 9:00 pm to 11:00 pm during that week.NHL on Fox (FoxTrax era): Fox Sports's decision to implement a CGI-generated glowing hockey puck during their live coverage of the National Hockey League from 1996 to 1998 drew ire from sports fans, who derided the move as a gimmick. Greg Wyshinski wrote of the glowing puck as one of the worst ideas in sports history in his book Glow Pucks and Ten-Cent Beer: The 101 Worst Ideas in Sports History.
NBC Olympic broadcasts (1964, 1988–present [summer]; 1972, 2002–present [winter]) NBC was the inaugural Olympic broadcaster at the 1964 Tokyo Summer Olympics. They later broadcast the 1972 Winter Olympics. NBC brought the broadcast rights to start with the 1988 Summer Olympics, and would obtain rights to broadcast the Winter Olympics starting in 2002. Currently, NBCUniversal (a division of Comcast which operates NBC and its cable networks) holds the broadcasting rights for the Olympics until 2032. Since 2000, NBC has received criticism over its tape-delaying practice, which has gotten many complaints from many viewers, yet in 1992, the then-NBC Sports producer Terry O'Neil coined the term "possibly live" for NBC's practices to tape delay live events as if they were live. Some examples include the Women's Gymnastics event during the 2016 Summer Olympics in order to "juice the numbers". In the 2010 Winter Olympics, NBC aired no alpine skiing events in order to showcase high-profile events. Many viewers have expressed outrage, including U.S. senators during the 2010 Winter games, and people were forced to use VPN servers to access the BBC and in Canada, CTV (for the 2010 Winter Games and 2012 Summer Games), and the CBC (for the 2014 Winter Games and 2016 Summer Games) to view them live.
NBC has also frequently been criticized for airing the Olympics as if it is more of a reality television program instead of a live sports event. One example of this includes cutting off a fall from Russian gymnast Ksenia Afanasyeva, which NBC Sports chairman Mark Lazarus did "in the interest of time," although her routine took only 1 minute and 38 seconds. And according to The New York Times, he did this to create suspense on the U.S. Women's Gymnastics team.
In 2016, chief marketing officer John Miller held a press conference prior to the 2016 Summer Olympics about their formatting of NBC's Olympics coverage, citing that the Olympics were "not about the result, [but] about the journey. The people who watch the Olympics are not particularly sports fans. More women watch the Games than men, and for the women, they're less interested in the result and more interested in the journey. It's sort of like the ultimate reality show and mini-series wrapped into one." This led to criticism from the media; Linda Stasi of the New York Daily News claimed it to be "sexist nonsense" and a "pandering, condescending view of the millions of women viewers." Washington Post columnist Sally Jenkins suggested that "it insults the audience — but it sure does insult Olympic athletes, especially female athletes."
NBC was also criticized for frequently editing and tape-delaying the opening and closing ceremonies, with "context" as its main reason. In 2010, NBC aired the opening and closing ceremonies on a tape delay, even for viewers on Pacific Time, despite being 3 hours behind Eastern Time. During the closing ceremonies, NBC went into a 65-minute intermission to air a series premiere of The Marriage Ref and local newscasts, and returning to the ceremonies at 11:35 PM ET/PT. This spawned outbursts from upset viewers, especially on Twitter, when several performances were cut off.
In 2012, NBC cut a tribute to the victims of the July 7, 2005 London bombings in favor of a Ryan Seacrest interview with U.S. swimmer Michael Phelps during the opening ceremonies. Ultimately, this caused the hashtag #NBCFail to trend on Twitter. The network was criticized for cutting up to 27% of the closing ceremonies to air local newscasts and a sneak preview of the NBC sitcom Animal Practice.
In 2014, NBC also received criticism for cutting the video segments on the Olympic Torch relay and not showing the mascots. It also received criticism for cutting the Olympic Oaths and IOC President Thomas Bach's speech on discrimination and equality. It was also criticized for setting a 90-minute window to air the closing ceremonies. In addition, they used the times before and after the 90-minute window to air a sneak preview of another sitcom, Growing Up Fisher, at 10:30 PM ET/PT, and a documentary on Tonya Harding and Nancy Kerrigan which aired between 7 PM and 8:30 PM ET/PT. In 2016, NBC aired both of the ceremonies in a 1-hour delay (at 8 PM ET/PT) and it also drew criticism for the excessive amount of advertisements it aired during the delayed ceremony, and cutting 38% of the closing ceremony.
NBC also received criticism for an alleged pro-American biasFanfare for the American: NBC’s Prime-Time Broadcast of the 2012 London Olympiad - SAGE Journals despite such bias being far less than other national Olympic broadcasters such as Canada and Russia, and for various comments made by commentators during the Olympics in 2016 and in the opening ceremony of the 2012 Olympics.

Olympics Triplecast Even before the 1992 Summer Olympics started, many criticized the business model. On July 16, nine days before the Opening Ceremony, one Philadelphia Inquirer writer called it "the biggest marketing disaster since New Coke". The Triplecast was deemed by The New York Times "sports TV's biggest flop" and that NBC and Cablevision were "bereft in sanity" in operating it. By 1994, it was referred to as "the Heaven's Gate of television" Albert Kim, the editor of Entertainment Weekly, went on National Public Radio and called it "an unmitigated disaster for NBC". It was a loss of about $100 million (half of which was covered by Cablevision under agreement) for the two parties, and shaped NBC's strategies in the coverage of future Olympics.The Premiership: In 2000, ITV took over terrestrial broadcasting rights the highlights of the English Premier League, following a bidding war against its rival and long-time rights holder, the BBC (known for broadcasting its similar show Match of the Day) at a reported cost of £183 million to commence at the start of the 2001–02 Premier League season. The first show aired at 7pm on 18 August 2001 was watched by a peak figure of 5 million viewers, in comparison to The Weakest Link which drew an average of 7 million when shown on rival channel BBC One at the same time. The channel suffered their worst Saturday night ratings for five years, when an average of 3.1 million viewers watched The Premiership. Not helped was the media and football critics – most notably the Daily Mirror – were outspoken about the programme's highlights. Out of the 70 minutes on air, the first show included only 28 minutes of action, compared to the average of 58 minutes on MotD the previous season. At the end of its contract run in May 2004, rights for the league were sold back to the BBC.Thursday Night Football: Throughout its decade-plus run, the package of National Football League games have been subjected to a barrage of criticism. Among the controversies were the hiring of Bryant Gumbel as its first play-by-play announcer, difficulties in getting NFL Network onto cable providers, poor quality of the games, a uniform scheme that caused great difficulty for those with color blindness to tell teams apart, disruption to the flow of the league's weekly schedule (the league is forbidden under federal law from televising games on Friday or Saturday for most of the regular season) in a way that potentially puts players at greater risk of injury, and a perception that the package saturates the market with NFL products and was thus driving down the viewership of the league's Sunday and Monday games. On at least one occasion, the league has reportedly considered ending the package after its current contracts expire.XFL on NBC, XFL on TNN and XFL on UPN: The three television programs covering the XFL are generally treated as one for the purposes of worst television show lists. The series, the subject of Brett Forrest's book Long Bomb: How the XFL Became TV's Biggest Fiasco, ranked No. 3 on the 2002 TV Guide list of worst TV series of all time, #2 on ESPN's list of biggest sports flops, #21 on TV Guide's 2010 list of the biggest television blunders of all time, and #10 on Entertainment Weekly's list of the biggest bombs in television history.TV's 50 biggest bombs and blunders|EW.com Despite the league's failure, both of its co-founders would try again nearly two decades later: NBC's Dick Ebersol with the Alliance of American Football in 2019 (which ran out of money midway through its only season), and McMahon with another XFL in 2020 (which he sold to Dwayne Johnson and Dany Garcia during the pandemic shutdown ahead of his total exit from sports entertainment two years later); the latter is scheduled to return from its extended hiatus in 2023.

Talk showsThe Chevy Chase Show: A late night talk-show hosted by Chevy Chase that aired on Fox in 1993. It received negative reviews from critics,TIME article: "Late-Night Mugging".  and ranked 16th on TV Guide's list of worst television shows and the same position on its list of biggest television blunders; former Fox chairwoman Lucie Salhany described it as "uncomfortable and embarrassing," and the series was cancelled within six weeks of its debut.The New York Times article: "Chevy Chase's Show Canceled After 6 Weeks".The Jeremy Kyle Show: British tabloid talk show which presented family disputes and the like. Often accused of treating its guests in an exploitative way, it was permanently scrapped in May 2019 when a guest died a week after appearing and failing a lie detector test on the show, apparently taking his own life.The Jerry Springer Show: The trash TV showHow 90s Trash TV Became Deadly|Dark Side of the 90s - VICE on YouTube topped TV Guide magazine's 2002 list of "The Worst TV Shows Ever". The phrase "Jerry Springer Nation" began to be used by some who see the program as being a bad influence on the morality of the United States.The Magic Hour: Soon after its debut, the series was panned by critics citing Earvin "Magic" Johnson's apparent nervousness as a host, his overly complimentary tone with his celebrity guests, and lack of chemistry with his sidekick, comedian Craig Shoemaker. The series was quickly retooled with Shoemaker being relegated to the supporting cast (and eventually fired for publicly stating the show was a disaster) which included comedian Steve White and announcer Jimmy Hodson. Comedian and actor Tommy Davidson was brought in as Johnson's new sidekick and Johnson interacted more with the show band leader Sheila E. The format of the show was also changed to include more interview time with celebrity guests. One vocal critic of The Magic Hour was Howard Stern, who was later booked as a guest for one episode as part of a stunt to boost ratings.Maury: This tabloid talk show hosted by Maury Povich was dubbed by USA Today columnist Whitney Matheson as "the worst show on television" and "miles further down the commode than Jerry Springer." The New York Post listed it among the "20 worst shows on TV right now" in 2013: "Since 1991, Maury Povich has slathered us with trashy tales of abusive spouses, kinky freaks and promiscuous teens." The A.V. Club wrote in 2016 that "Maury has been lowering the daytime TV bar for 25 years" by "ruthlessly exploiting the misery and misfortune of its guests for ratings."

Variety and sketch comedy showsThe 1/2 Hour News Hour: Fox News Channel's satirical news comedy show was criticized for its obvious intent to imitate Comedy Central's The Daily Show from a more politically conservative slant. The show's initial two episodes received generally poor reviews. MetaCritic's television division gave The 1/2 Hour News Hour pilots a score of 12 out of 100, making it the lowest rated television production ever reviewed on the site. Business Insider ranked it #1 on its list of "The 50 worst TV shows in modern history, according to critics".Australia's Naughtiest Home Videos: The series was cancelled by its network midway through its first airing. Kerry Packer, Australian media magnate and owner of the broadcaster Nine Network, saw the show while out at dinner with friends, and reportedly phoned Nine central control personally, ordering them to "Get that shit off the air!" The network complied and immediately replaced it with reruns of Cheers, citing "technical difficulties." Packer arrived at the network the next day and again referred to the show as "disgusting and offensive shit." The show itself largely consisted of videos involving crude sexual content interspersed with off-color jokes from the show's host, former 2MMM morning host "Uncle" Doug Mulray. The show would not be seen in its entirety until 2008, three years after Packer's death.Ben Elton Live From Planet Earth: Live From Planet Earth debuted on Channel Nine on 8 February 2011, in the 9:30 pm timeslot. During the broadcast of the first episode, reaction on Twitter was hostile, with many users speculating the show would be axed. Reviews of the first episode were largely negative. Colin Vickery of the Herald Sun called it "an early contender for worst show of the year", and Amanda Meade of The Australian called it "a screaming, embarrassing failure". The Ages Karl Quinn stated there was "more to like than dislike" about the show.Horne & Corden: This was a sketch show written by and starring James Corden and Mathew Horne, following their tenure in the hugely successful sitcom Gavin & Stacey. Unlike the latter, the show garnered largely negative reviews in the press. The show was cancelled, and Corden stated that the sketch show was a mistake.Osbournes Reloaded: This variety show was universally panned by critics, with Roger Catlin of the Hartford Courant even going so far as to call it the "worst variety show ever" and Tom Shales of The Washington Post labeling it "Must-Flee TV". It was canceled after one episode, which itself was cut from 60 to 35 minutes prior to air; 26 affiliates had refused to air the first show or buried it in overnight graveyard slots, and Fox had barely convinced a group of 19 other stations to drop its plans to do the same. Rolling Stone named it one of the 12 worst TV shows of all time.Pink Lady (also known as Pink Lady and Jeff): The series ranked No. 35 on TV Guides Fifty Worst TV Shows of All Time list. The series, which featured Japanese duo Pink Lady struggling awkwardly through American disco hits and sketch comedy (the duo spoke very little English), was moved to the Friday night death slot after one episode and killed off after five episodes. (A sixth episode was unaired at the time but later included in a DVD release.)Rosie Live: This NBC variety special hosted by comedian and activist Rosie O'Donnell on the day before Thanksgiving 2008 received almost universally negative reviews from critics. The Los Angeles Times critic Mary McNamara wrote, "For those of us who are, and remain, Rosie fans, who think The View will never quite recover from her departure, who think her desire to resurrect the variety show was, and is, a great idea, disappointment does not even begin to describe it." TV Guide critic Matt Roush panned the show as "dead on arrival," while Variety wrote "If Rosie O'Donnell and company were consciously determined to strangle the rebirth of variety shows in the crib, they couldn't have done a better job of it than this pre-holiday turkey." The show had been cleared for a tentative January 2009 launch as a regular series, but the show's poor reception led to the cancellation of those plans.Ryantown: Ryantown was named as one of the "Top 10 Worst Irish TV Programmes" by the Irish Independent and host Gerry Ryan was later to admit that it was all horribly "half-baked" and "should have been taken off the air after a few shows".Saturday Night Live with Howard Cosell: Saturday Night Lives director Don Mischer remembers the show as hectic and unprepared, and has recalled one particular episode wherein executive producer Roone Arledge discovered that Lionel Hampton was in New York, and invited the musician to appear on the show an hour before the show was set to go on the air. The show fared poorly among critics and audiences alike, with TV Guide calling it "dead on arrival, with a cringingly awkward host." Alan King, the show's "executive in charge of comedy," later admitted that it was difficult trying to turn Cosell into a variety show host, saying that he "made Ed Sullivan look like Buster Keaton." Saturday Night Live with Howard Cosell was canceled on January 17, 1976, after only 18 episodes. A year later, in 1977, the NBC sketch show Saturday Night finally got permission to be named Saturday Night Live due to the cancellation of this version of Saturday Night Live and hired many cast members who worked on the ABC version (the most notable being Bill Murray, who was hired after the departure of Chevy Chase).The Tom Green Show: This comedy show written by and starring controversial Canadian comedian Tom Green was ranked No. 41 on TV Guides 50 Worst TV Shows of All Time list. In 2001, Green also produced the film Freddy Got Fingered, which featured a similar style of humor and is also considered one of the worst films of all time to the point of winning the Golden Raspberry Award for Worst Picture.The Wilton North Report: Almost from the outset, creative differences occurred between The Wilton North Reports writing team, executive producer Barry Sand, and hosts Phil Cowan and Paul Robins. The hosts thought the writers' material was too sophisticated for mass audiences and frequently not very funny; the writers thought Cowan and Robins were less than erudite and felt uncomfortable writing for them. Sand tried to make peace between the hosts and writers, seeking material that Cowan and Robins would feel comfortable with yet encouraging the hosts to tone down their shrill delivery. Pre-debut rehearsals did not impress Sand nor Fox executives, who decided on November 29 to push back Wilton Norths premiere, which had been scheduled for the next night, to allow the crew extra time to gel (the hosts and writers had been together for not even a week). The delay also meant a retooling of the show, beginning with Sand's scrapping of the opening news review segment; Sand believed it did not mesh with Cowan and Robin's friendly approach, while Fox objected to its crude humor. By the time Wilton North did finally reach the air on December 11, its own cast and crew would have difficulty articulating what the show was even trying to do. The on-air product was met with general derision from critics; Clifford Terry of the Chicago Tribune said the show took a smug, studious approach to its subject material, while Ken Tucker of the Philadelphia Inquirer thought the "video version of Spy magazine" lacked "genuinely amusing rudeness." Later episodes of Wilton North would see a greater reliance on long-form videos and feature reporting, with such examples including a report presented by Aron Ranen on a dominatrix that specialized in corporal punishment, as well as a feature on a high school basketball team in South Carolina that hadn't won a game in five years (though they pulled off a win when a Wilton North crew filmed them in action). The idea was to have Cowan and Robins generally serve as presenters and offer comments on what was being shown. Staff writer and commentator Paul Krassner would also be on hand to introduce and discuss "underground videos" with the hosts. Krassner, in what he would later term a "practice" segment, discussed the highlights of 1987 with Cowan and Robins on the January 1 broadcast, with the possibility that such analyses would become permanent the following week (a possibility Krassner was thrilled about doing, as he would recall in a February 1988 Los Angeles Times piece about his time at Wilton North). By this time, however, Fox's affiliates grew restless and demanded that the show be cancelled immediately; Fox would announce Wilton North''s cancellation on January 5, 1988, with network president Jamie Kellner calling the show "a bit too ambitious." The show's 21st and final episode would air on January 8.

See also

List of television series canceled after one episode
List of television series canceled before airing an episode
List of films considered the worst
Hate-watching

References

Further reading

External links
The 20 Worst TV Shows | HEAVY
20 Worst TV Shows Ever Made (According To Rotten Tomatoes)
20 Worst TV Shows Ever Made (According To IMDb)

Television series
Worst
Criticism of television series
Film and video fandom